The Town of Crook is a Statutory Town in Logan County, Colorado, United States.  The town population was 133 at the 2020 United States Census. Crook is a part of the Sterling, CO Micropolitan Statistical Area.

Toponymy
The town was named for General George Crook, officer during the American Civil War and the Indian Wars.   Crook has frequently been noted on lists of unusual place names.

Geography
Crook is located at  (40.858586, -102.801195).

Climate

According to the Köppen Climate Classification system, Crook has a cold semi-arid climate, abbreviated "BSk" on climate maps.

Demographics

As of the census of 2000, there were 128 people, 57 households, and 38 families residing in the town. The racial makeup of the town was 100.00% White. Hispanic or Latino of any race were 3.91% of the population.

There were 57 households, out of which 17.5% had children under the age of 18 living with them, 63.2% were married couples living together, 1.8% had a female householder with no husband present, and 33.3% were non-families. 33.3% of all households were made up of individuals, and 17.5% had someone living alone who was 65 years of age or older. The average household size was 2.25 and the average family size was 2.82.

In the town, the population was spread out, with 18.0% under the age of 18, 8.6% from 18 to 24, 19.5% from 25 to 44, 31.3% from 45 to 64, and 22.7% who were 65 years of age or older. The median age was 50 years. For every 100 females, there were 109.8 males. For every 100 females age 18 and over, there were 101.9 males.

The median income for a household in the town was $32,500, and the median income for a family was $35,833. Males had a median income of $29,167 versus $26,250 for females. The per capita income for the town was $19,127. There were no families and 3.7% of the population living below the poverty line, including no under eighteens and 10.3% of those over 64.

See also

Colorado
Bibliography of Colorado
Index of Colorado-related articles
Outline of Colorado
List of counties in Colorado
List of municipalities in Colorado
List of places in Colorado
List of statistical areas in Colorado
Sterling, CO Micropolitan Statistical Area

References

External links

CDOT map of the Town of Crook

Towns in Logan County, Colorado
Towns in Colorado